The Xiao Hui Wang Art Museum is a contemporary art museum in Suzhou. It is notable for being one of the few museums in China named after a living artist.

History
The museum is located in the historical Pingjiang District, in a specially renovated and refurbished 400-year-old Suzhou landmark called Ding Mansion. The original structure had been respectively built and rebuilt during the Ming (1368-1644) and Qing (1644-1912) dynasties, and has been left largely intact.

The museum holds four individual exhibition rooms, one large exhibition hall and a courtyard with a garden. It opened in 2013.

References

Art museums and galleries in China
Contemporary art galleries in China
Museums in Suzhou